Verdite is a trade name for two green stones found in Africa

A variety of serpentinite
A variety of fuchsite